Byablue is one of the last albums recorded by the so-called 'American Quartet' of jazz pianist Keith Jarrett. It was recorded in October 1976 in two sessions that also helped produce the album Bop-Be. Released on the Impulse label in 1977, it features performances by Jarrett, Dewey Redman, Charlie Haden, and Paul Motian. Musically speaking, even though the album Eyes of the Heart made it last to the market, Byablue and Bop-Be document the swan song of Jarrett's American Quartet in several ways, but most of all the inclusion of compositions by members other than Jarrett himself deliver another taste. While that did not happen before, for what would be the quartet's final recording sessions, Jarrett requested that band members contribute with their own compositions. Byablue consisted primarily of Paul Motian's pieces, while Bop-Be included Redman and Haden's contributions.

Background: disbanding the American Quartet 
As Neil Tesser details on his 1996 extensive notes found in the compilation album Mysteries: The Impulse Years 1975-1976 (which contains all the tracks recorded in that period, including alternate takes) the following was the story of Jarrett's American Quartet last "marathon recording sessions" taking place from December 1975 to October 1976:

Byablue and Bop-Be: the last sessions 
Having conversed with Keith Jarrett, on the text found in Mysteries: The Impulse Years 1975-1976 Neil Tesser transcribes a few Jarrett's reflections regarding the inclusion of musical material authored by Redman, Haden and Motian:

Tesser ends up assuming that after Byablue and Bop-Be, artistically and musically the group had already given its best: "Interesting as this experiment proved, it did not convince Jarrett that his most pessimistic assessments were misplaced. The music failed to kick-start the band into a higher orbit."

Reception 
The Allmusic review by Richard S. Ginell awarded the album 4 stars, stating, "The band certainly doesn't sound as if it was ready to break up; the interplay is telepathic, the musical ideas are still fresh, and there is a willingness to experiment. Highly recommended."

Track listing 
All compositions by Paul Motian except as indicated 
 "Byablue" - 7:19  
 "Konya"  (Jarrett) - 3:21  
 "Rainbow" (Margot Jarrett) - 8:32  
 "Trieste" - 9:37  
 "Fantasm" - 1:12  
 "Yahllah" - 8:27  
 "Byablue" - 3:42

Personnel 
 Keith Jarrett - piano, soprano saxophone, percussion
 Dewey Redman - tenor saxophone, musette
 Charlie Haden - bass
 Paul Motian - drums, percussion

Production
 Esmond Edwards - producer
 Tony May - recording engineer
 Barney Perkins  - remixing engineer
 Geoff Sykes - mastering engineer
 Frank Mulvey - art direction
 Philip Chiang - design

References 

Keith Jarrett albums
Impulse! Records albums
1977 albums